The  is a railway line operated by West Japan Railway Company (JR West) within Hiroshima Prefecture in Japan. It begins at Mihara Station in Mihara and terminates at Kaitaichi Station in Kaita. It is one of the main lines of JR West. The section between Mihara Station to Hiro Station is branded the "Setouchi Sazanami Line" (Seto Inland Sea Ripple Line) as the sightseeing line. On the section between Mihara Station and Hiro Station, most trains operate from Hiro Station through Mihara Station to Itozaki Station. On the section between Hiro Station and Kaitaichi Station, most trains operate from Hiro Station through Kaitaichi Station to Hiroshima Station or Iwakuni Station.

Special trains

 Akiji Liner: Runs the section between Hiroshima Station to Kure Station in about 30 minutes.
 etSETOta: Sightseeing train operated since October 1, 2005. Renamed from Setouchi Marine View in 2019.

Stations
The Kure Line is entirely within Hiroshima Prefecture.

Rolling stock
New 2- and 3-car 227 series electric trains are scheduled to be introduced on the Kure Line from around 2015, replacing older 115 series trains.

History

The Kaitashi - Kure section was opened as a private line in 1903, and leased to the Sanyo Railway Co. the following year, before being nationalised in 1906. Individual section opening dates are given below.

The Mihara - Sunami section opened in 1930, and the two sections were connected in 1935. Work to duplicate the line at Kure commenced in 1940, but was abandoned due to material shortages in 1945.

The entire line was electrified in 1970, and freight services ceased in 1986.

Kure Line
Opened the line between Kaitaichi Station to Kure Station including Yano Station, Saka Station, Tennō Station and Yoshiura Station on December 27, 1903.
Opened temporary station (Hamasaki Station) on July 28, 1904.
Rent for Sanyo Railway from December 1, 1904.
Nationalized from December 1, 1906.
Named "Kure Line" as one of national rail ways on October 12, 1909.
Opened Koyaura Station and Closed Hamasaki Station on May 1, 1914.
Opened temporary station (Akihamasaki Station) on July 21, 1926.
Opened temporary station (Karyugahama Station) on July 7, 1928.
Extended the line from Kure Station to Hiro Station and opened Akiaga Station and Hiro Station on March 24, 1935.

Sango Line
Opened Sango Line between Mihara Station to Sunami Station on March 19, 1930.
Extended the line from Sunami Station to Akisaizaki Station on April 28, 1931.
Extended the line from Akisaizaki Station to Takehara Station including Tadanoumi Station and Ōnori Station on July 10, 1932.
Extended the line from Takehara Station to Mitsuuchinoumi Station including Yoshina Station, Akimitsu Station and Kazahaya Station on January 17, 1935.

Integration
Integrated Sango Line into Kure Line and opened Ato Station, Akikawajiri Station, Nigata Station and Kawaraishi Station on November 24, 1935.

After integration
Closed Kawaraishi Station on December 1, 1940.
Renamed Mitsuuchinoumi Station to Yasuura Station on May 1, 1946.
Renamed Akimitsu Station to Akitsu Station on December 20, 1949.
Re-opened Kawaraishi Station on August 1, 1958.
Closed temporary stations (Karyugahama Station and Akihamasaki Station) on August 1, 1967.
Electrified the rail way on September 15, 1970.
Stopped cargo services on December 1, 1986.
Privatized as JR West on April 1, 1987.
Opened Kure-Portopia Station on March 19, 1992.
Opened Akinagahama Station on October 1, 1994.
Opened Karugahama Station and Mizushiri Station and moved Kawaraishi Station on February 7, 1999.
Opened Shinhiro Station on March 23, 2002.

References

 
Lines of West Japan Railway Company
1067 mm gauge railways in Japan
Railway lines opened in 1903